Jesus Rojas (1950–1991) was a Nicaraguan major leader of the FMLN.

Jesus Rojas may also refer to:
 Jesús Rojas (Puerto Rican boxer) (born 1986)
 Jesús Rojas (Venezuelan boxer) (born 1964)